Akila Saliya Ellawala (born 6 January 1976) is a Sri Lankan politician, former provincial councillor and Member of Parliament.

Ellawala was born on 6 January 1976. He is the son of Mohan Ellawala, former Chief Minister of Sabaragamuwa Province. He was the Sri Lanka Freedom Party' organiser for Ratnapura District. He was vice chairman of the state owned State Engineering Corporation of Sri Lanka.

Ellawala was a member of the Sabaragamuwa Provincial Council. He contested the 2015 parliamentary election as one of the United People's Freedom Alliance (UPFA) electoral alliance's candidates in Ratnapura District but failed to get elected after coming 9th amongst the UPFA candidates. He contested the 2020 parliamentary election as a Sri Lanka People's Freedom Alliance electoral alliance candidate in Ratnapura District and was elected to the Parliament of Sri Lanka.

References

1976 births
Living people
Members of the 16th Parliament of Sri Lanka
Members of the Sabaragamuwa Provincial Council
Sinhalese politicians
Sri Lanka Freedom Party politicians
Sri Lankan Buddhists
Sri Lanka People's Freedom Alliance politicians
Sri Lanka Podujana Peramuna politicians
United People's Freedom Alliance politicians